Gordon Winrod (born December 30, 1926) is a Christian Identity minister who was sentenced to a 30-year prison term for abducting six of his grandchildren in 1994 and 1995. Winrod was also ordered to pay up to $26 million after two of his grandchildren brought suit against him.

Biography
Winrod was born on December 30, 1926, to Gerald Burton Winrod. He attended a Lutheran day school (grades 1 through 8), finished high school at Hesston High School in Hesston, Kansas, and attended St. John's College in Winfield, Kansas.

Winrod served in the U.S. Maritime Service and the U.S. Navy from January 1945 until August 1948. He married Genevieve Ann Dicke in Topeka, Kansas, in 1948. They have eleven children.

Winrod graduated from Concordia Theological Seminary in Springfield, Illinois, in 1955. He then served as pastor of Lutheran Church–Missouri Synod (LCMS) congregations in San Antonio, Texas, and in Little Rock, Arkansas.

Winrod began publishing The Winrod Letter in April, 1960. Soon thereafter the LCMS expelled him from its ministerial roster.

He moved to Gainesville, Missouri, in 1965 and established Our Savior's Independent Christian congregation.

Legacy
The Anti-Defamation League says that Winrod is an anti-Jewish propagandist. Winrod openly attacks Jews and Judaism in his writings. Winrod describes Jews as child-molesting perverts who hate God, practice the religion of Satan, run a "Secret Jewish World Government of anti-Christ", and says that the Jews have butchered, burned, and bled Christians (drinking warm Christian blood) down through the centuries.

References

External links

1926 births
Living people
American Christian clergy
American conspiracy theorists
American people convicted of kidnapping
Blood libel
Christian Identity
People from Kansas
Concordia Theological Seminary alumni
Prisoners and detainees of Missouri